A coronis (korōnís,  , korōnídes) is a textual symbol found in ancient Greek papyri that was used to mark the end of an entire work or of a major section in poetic and prose texts.  The coronis was generally placed in the left-hand margin of the text and was often accompanied by a paragraphos or a forked paragraphos (diple obelismene).

Etymology

Examples

See also
Obelism

Notes

Sources
Chantraine, P., Dictionnaire étymologique de la langue grecque (Paris: Éditions Klincksieck, 1968).
Liddell, H. G.; Scott, R., A Greek–English Lexicon, 9th ed. (Oxford: OUP, 1996).
Schironi, F., Τὸ Μέγα Βιβλίον: Book-Ends, End-Titles, and Coronides in Papyri with Hexametric Poetry (Durham, NC: The American Society of Papyrologists, 2010).
Turner, E. G., Greek Manuscripts of the Ancient World, 2nd rev. ed. by P.J. Parsons (London: Institute of Classical Studies, 1987).

Palaeography
Punctuation
Ancient Greek punctuation